The 2020 New Hampshire Democratic presidential primary took place on February 11, 2020, as the second nominating contest in the Democratic Party primaries for the 2020 presidential election, following the Iowa caucuses the week before. The New Hampshire primary was a semi-closed primary, meaning that only Democrats and independents were allowed to vote in this primary. New Hampshire sent 33 delegates to the national convention, of which 24 were pledged delegates allocated on the basis of the results of the primary, and the other 9 were unpledged delegates preselected independently of the primary results.

Senator Bernie Sanders won the primary with 25.6% of the vote, edging out former mayor Pete Buttigieg after his narrow win in Iowa, who came in second place with 24.3% of the vote. Both had already led the results in Iowa. This was a decline on support for Sanders, who in 2016 had won New Hampshire with 60.14% to Hillary Clinton's 37.68%. Both Sanders and Buttigieg received nine delegates, while Senator Amy Klobuchar unexpectedly finished in third place and received six delegates; her third-place finish was described as "Klomentum" or “Klobucharge” by several observers, but she was not able to make use of this in the following primaries. Senator Elizabeth Warren and former vice president Joe Biden, who had been the leading contenders nationally, both underperformed expectations, coming in fourth and fifth, respectively, and received no delegates. Entrepreneur Andrew Yang, former Massachusetts Governor Deval Patrick and Colorado Senator Michael Bennet finished eighth, tenth and eleventh respectively and all suspended their presidential campaigns after their poor results.

Voter turnout set a new record for New Hampshire primaries, with 298,377 ballots being cast, breaking the previous record of 287,527 set in the 2008 primary. This was the third consecutive contested Democratic primary in which New Hampshire voted for the candidate that did not receive the Democratic nomination. Despite underperforming quite drastically in this primary, Biden later went on to win the nomination, and defeat incumbent president Donald Trump in the general election, including a comfortable victory in New Hampshire.

Procedure
The state's ballot access laws have traditionally been lenient, with prospective presidential candidates required to pay only a $1,000 fee to secure a line on the primary ballot. Primary elections were held on Tuesday, February 11, 2020. The first polls opened at midnight local time (EST), with the vast majority of polling places closed by 7 p.m. and a small number of cities allowed to close at 8 p.m.

In the semi-closed primary, candidates had to meet a viability threshold of 15 percent at the congressional district or statewide level in order to be considered viable. The 24 pledged delegates to the 2020 Democratic National Convention were all allocated proportionally on the basis of the qualified results of the primary, in the two congressional districts and on statewide level respectively. Of these, 8 each were allocated to each of the state's 2 congressional districts and another 3 were allocated to party leaders and elected officials (PLEO delegates), in addition to 5 at-large delegates. The national convention delegation meeting was to be held in Concord on April 25, to vote on the exact names of the five at-large and three pledged PLEO delegates for the Democratic National Convention. The delegation also included 9 unpledged PLEO delegates (also known as superdelegates): 5 members of the Democratic National Committee and 4 members of Congress (both senators and 2 representatives).

Candidates on the ballot
The following candidates were on the ballot and are listed in order of filing.

Running

Mark Stewart Greenstein, Connecticut 
Pete Buttigieg, Indiana  
Thomas James Torgesen, New York
Henry Hewes, New York  
Bernie Sanders, Vermont
David John Thistle, Massachusetts
Michael A. Ellinger, California
Tulsi Gabbard, Hawaii  
Tom Koos, California
Amy Klobuchar, Minnesota  
Michael Bennet, Colorado
Andrew Yang, New York 
Joe Biden, Delaware
Steve Burke, New York
Tom Steyer, California 
Roque "Rocky" De La Fuente III, California
Robby Wells, Georgia
Elizabeth Warren, Massachusetts
Lorenz Kraus, New York
Raymond Michael Moroz, New York

Deval Patrick, Massachusetts
Sam Sloan, New York 
Rita Krichevsky, New Jersey 
Mosie Boyd, Arkansas  
Jason Evritte Dunlap, Maryland 

Withdrawn

Marianne Williamson, California
John Delaney, Maryland
Kamala Harris, California 
Steve Bullock, Montana
Julian Castro, Texas
Joe Sestak, Pennsylvania
Ben Gleib, California
Cory Booker, New Jersey

Brian Moore qualified but withdrew early enough so that he did not appear on the ballot.

Forums and other events
Prospective candidates began making visits to New Hampshire in 2017. Among the more notable events of the campaign was the 2019 state convention, at which 19 of the candidates give speeches. The eighth Democratic primary debate took place in the state on February 7, 2020. A Lesser-Known Candidates Forum was also held, featuring candidates on the New Hampshire ballot but who were not considered major candidates.

Polling

Results
The first results in New Hampshire were released shortly after midnight from Dixville Notch. Although not on the ballot, Michael Bloomberg received three write-in votes, enough to carry the town. Bernie Sanders won the state by a margin of around four thousand votes over Pete Buttigieg, with Amy Klobuchar placing third. Sanders and Buttigieg each received nine pledged national convention delegates while Klobuchar received six. Sanders had previously won the state in his prior pursuit of the Democratic nomination in 2016 with some 152,000 votes (60.4% of the total) against Hillary Clinton. 

Voter turnout set a new record for New Hampshire primaries with 298,377 ballots being cast, breaking the previous record of 287,527 set in the 2008 primary.

Results by county

Analysis
Bernie Sanders narrowly won the New Hampshire primary with 25.6% of the vote, the lowest vote share a winner of this primary has ever received, with Pete Buttigieg finishing in second. By contrast, Amy Klobuchar finished in an unexpectedly strong third place. Elizabeth Warren and Joe Biden finished in fourth and fifth place, respectively, both of which were considered disappointing finishes. Geographically, Sanders won the largest cities in New Hampshire, including Manchester, Nashua, and Concord. Buttigieg kept the race close by performing strongly in the southeastern part of the state, including in the suburbs of Boston and in the nearby, more rural Lakes Region.

Exit polls showed that Sanders benefited from his strong performance among young voters as he won about half of the under-30 vote, with this group making up about 14% of the electorate. Among those under the age of 45, he won 42% of the vote; this larger group made up about a third of the electorate. Buttigieg received only 21% of the vote among those under the age of 45 but outperformed Sanders 26–17 among voters 45 and older. Both Sanders and Buttigieg lost the 45-and-older vote to Klobuchar, who received 27% of the vote in this group. Similarly, Klobuchar convincingly won among voters aged 65 and older, receiving 32% of their votes, as compared to only 14% for Sanders and 12% for Biden. Ideologically, about 60% of voters identified as either "very liberal" or "somewhat liberal", and Sanders won this group with about 33% of the vote. By contrast, among the remaining 40% of voters who identified as "moderate" or "conservative", Buttigieg and Klobuchar approximately tied with 27 and 26% of the vote, respectively.

Aftermath
Following poor showings in the New Hampshire primary, Senator Michael Bennet of Colorado, entrepreneur Andrew Yang and former Massachusetts governor Deval Patrick withdrew from the race. With the end of these campaigns, the Democratic field numbered fewer than ten candidates for the first time since early 2019.

Notes

See also
 2020 New Hampshire Republican presidential primary
 "Live from Lanford", an episode of The Conners
 New Hampshire midnight voting

References

External links
The Green Papers delegate allocation summary
New Hampshire Democratic Party draft delegate selection plan 
FiveThirtyEight New Hampshire primary poll tracker
NBC10 Boston/NECN New Hampshire candidate tracker

Democratic primary
New Hampshire Democratic
February 2020 events in the United States
2020